Chasing Daylight, released in 2003, is Sister Hazel's fourth studio album.

Track listing 
"Your Mistake" (Ken Block) - 4:09
"Come Around" (Block, Jett Beres) - 3:56
"One Love" (Block, Montana, Ryan Newell, Paul, Robbins) - 3:29 
"Best I'll Ever Be" (Block, Andrew Copeland) - 4:50
"Life Got in the Way" (Block, Richard Marx) - 3:38
"Everybody" (Block, Beres, Newell) -  3:31
"Swan Dive" (Block, Newell, Beres, Sillers) -  3:46
"Killing Me Too" (Block) - 5:37
"Sword and Shield" (Block) - 5:06
"Hopeless" (Copeland, Lynch) - 6:10
"Effortlessly" (Block, Beres, Newell) - 4:06 
"Can't Believe" (Copeland) - 4:33

Acoustic versions 

The band also released an EP of acoustic versions of three of the songs: "Everybody," "Your Mistake," and "Best I'll Ever Be."

Personnel 
Ken Block - lead vocals, acoustic guitar
Jett Beres - bass, harmony vocals
Andrew Copeland - rhythm guitar, vocals
Ryan Newell - lead and slide guitar, harmony vocals
Mark Trojanowski - drums

Charts 

Singles

References 

2003 albums
Sister Hazel albums